Lara Petusky Coger is an American freelance print journalist and television producer.

Coger has covered the Dominican Republic, Miami, security in the wake of the September 11, 2001 attacks, Cuba and Hurricane Katrina for The New York Times.

Coger was a founding director of the Cine las Americas Festival of New Latin American Cinema in the 1990s.

She is a graduate of the University of Texas at Austin and also holds a graduate degree in Public Diplomacy from the University of Southern California Annenberg School for Communication and Journalism.

Notes

Living people
Writers from California
University of Texas at Austin alumni
The New York Times writers
American freelance journalists
USC Annenberg School for Communication and Journalism alumni
Year of birth missing (living people)
21st-century American journalists